Nahid Munir al-Rayyis (1937–2010) was a Palestinian politician, philanthropist, author and poet. He had formerly served as the Justice Minister of the Palestinian National Authority.

Biography
Al-Rayyis was born in Gaza City, British Mandate Palestine in 1937. He moved to Egypt in 1954 and graduated from Cairo University with a Bachelor of Laws in 1958.

Afterward, al-Rayyis joined the Palestinian Liberation Organization's armed wing and became a leader of the group in Beirut, Lebanon. Along with hundreds of other PLO leaders, he was exiled from Lebanon to Tunisia following the Lebanese Civil War. He returned to Gaza in 1996 and was appointed Deputy Speaker of the Palestinian Legislative Council representing Gaza City under the leadership of Palestinian President Yasser Arafat and as an adviser of the Palestinian Supreme Court. In January 1997, he was appointed to Fatah's second highest-ranking governing body, the Revolutionary Council.

Al-Rayyis served as the Justice Minister of the Palestinian National Authority's emergency government in October 2003. However, he resigned in 2004 citing new laws passed making it difficult for him and his ministry to operate as well as the increased presence of foreign interests (according to him, this included Israel, the United States, and the European Union).

In addition to politics, he was a well-known poet. Most of his work revolved around the Palestinian political struggle and Palestinian culture. He wrote several songs about Palestinian cities and authored the book Palestine in the Critical Period.

After being hospitalized for deteriorating health, al-Rayyis died in Gaza on April 13, 2010. Following his death, dignitaries from every Palestinian faction (including both Fatah and Hamas—which has de facto control over the Gaza Strip) and some parliamentary blocs extended condolences to al-Rayyis's family.

References

Bibliography
 

1937 births
2010 deaths
Cairo University alumni
Palestinian male poets
People from Gaza City
Government ministers of the Palestinian National Authority
Fatah members
20th-century Palestinian poets
Members of the 1996 Palestinian Legislative Council